Alba Regia is a 1961 Hungarian drama film directed by Mihály Szemes. It was entered into the 2nd Moscow International Film Festival where it won the Silver Prize.

Cast
 Tatiana Samoilova as Alba
 Miklós Gábor as Hajnal
 Imre Ráday as Konrád
 Hédi Váradi as Nurse
 Ferenc Bessenyei as Soviet major
 Imre Sinkovits as Gestapo officer
 József Kautzky as Helmuth

References

External links
 

1961 films
1961 drama films
1960s Hungarian-language films
Hungarian black-and-white films
Hungarian drama films